J. J. Pearce High School is a high school located in Richardson, Texas, United States. It is named after Joseph Jones “J.J.” Pearce, the superintendent for the Richardson Independent School District (RISD) from 1946 to 1977. In 2018, it had an enrollment of 2,323 and a student-teacher ratio of 14.5:1.

History

Pearce was established in 1967 with a group of tenth graders housed at Richardson North Junior High School. Prior to 1967, all high school students in the Pearce area attended Richardson High School. In 1969, the school moved to its current home on Coit Road; the campus has been expanded several times since. Along with Berkner High School, it is one of two RISD high schools to have a natatorium.  While Pearce hosts a natatorium, Eagle-Mustang Stadium is shared with Richardson High School. An indoor training facility was built in 2018 to accommodate Pearce athletes.

The graduating class of 1987 was reunited on the TV Land original program High School Reunion, which premiered on March 5, 2008.

Pearce was named a National Blue Ribbon School. from 1988 through 1989

On September 15, 2016, the school hosted the world premiere of the high school edition of Heathers: The Musical.

In September 2017, two Pearce students were accused of creating racist memes during the week leading up to the school's annual in-town rivalry football game against Richardson High School. The most controversial meme depicted the Pearce High School logo over KKK members and the Richardson High School logo over a burning cross. Each student served an out of school suspension.

Academics 
Newsweek ranked Pearce at #528 in the top 1,000 high schools in the nation. Schools were ranked based on the number of students who took Advanced Placement courses and AP tests. 

In 2009, the state classified 81% of Pearce's graduates as "college ready", or ready to undergo university studies. The State of Texas defined "college readiness" by scores on the ACT and SAT, and in the 11th grade Texas Assessment of Knowledge and Skills (TAKS) tests. During the same year, the school's student body had 22% poor students, and 27% of its students had a risk of dropping out. Holly K. Hacker of The Dallas Morning News said that the readiness rate was about 20 points higher than statistics would predict, and that the school "far exceeds what is expected."

J.J. Pearce High School was a recognized school in 2007-2008 as well.

Notable alumni
Jeff Agoos (b. 1968), National Soccer Hall of Fame and World Cup soccer player who won five Major League Soccer championships. Two-time Parade High School All-American and Dallas All-Sports Athlete of the Year.
 Shane Carruth (b. 1972), filmmaker responsible for Primer and Upstream Color.
 Ray Childress (b. 1962), class of 1981, NFL Pro Bowl defensive lineman.
 Corey Coleman (b. 1994), New York Giants wide receiver, 2015 Fred Biletnikoff Award winner.
 Julie Cypher (b. 1964), class of 1982, motion picture director, ex-wife of actor Lou Diamond Phillips, and ex-partner of singer Melissa Etheridge.
 William Martens (b. 1964), class of 1982, Emmy nominated (2010) documentary filmmaker.
 Anthony Dorsett (b. 1973), class of 1992, son of Hall of Fame running back for the Dallas Cowboys and Denver Broncos, Tony Dorsett. Former defensive back for the Tennessee Titans and Oakland Raiders.
 Asaf Epstein (b. 1978), class of 1996, film director, writer, and producer.
 Lane Garrison (b. 1980), class of 1998, actor on Prison Break.
 Chris Jacke (b. 1966), class of 1984, NFL kicker
 Bavand Karim (b. 1979), class of 1996, film and TV producer.
 Jaren Lewison (b. 2000), class of 2019, actor on Netflix series Never Have I Ever
 Alejandro Moreno (b. 1979), professional soccer player who won three MLS Cups with three different teams, while being capped 41 times at the international level with Venezuela.
 Bryn Neuenschwander (b. 1980), class of 1998, fantasy author.
 Kin Shriner (b 1953), class of 1972, actor best known for his run on soap operas including General Hospital.
 Wil Shriner (b. 1953), class of 1972, television and movie actor.
 Jessica Simpson (b. 1980), recording artist, actress, dropped out of Pearce after her junior year in 1997.
 Scott Turner (b. 1972), class of 1991, NFL defensive back and politician.
 Drew Timme (b. 2000), class of 2019, college basketball player for the Gonzaga Bulldogs

References

External links

 
 School District Website

1967 establishments in Texas
Educational institutions established in 1967
High schools in Richardson, Texas
Richardson Independent School District high schools